Bangladesh participated in the 2007 Asian Indoor Games which were held in Macau, China from 26 October to 3 November 2007.

Medalists

References

Nations at the 2007 Asian Indoor Games
2007 in Bangladeshi sport
Bangladesh at the Asian Indoor Games